Kuber Nath Rai (26 March 1933 – 5 June 1996), also written as Kubernath Ray and Kuber Nath Ray, was a writer and scholar of Hindi literature and Sanskrit.

Early life
Kuber Nath Rai was born in Bhumihar Brahmin family in Matsa village of Ghazipur district in Uttar Pradesh, India. His father's name was Vakunth Narayan Rai. He got his early education at village Matsa. However he did his matriculation from Queen's College, Varanasi. For higher studies he got enrolled in Banaras Hindu University (BHU). He did his master's in English Literature from Calcutta University. As an academician he started his career with Vikram Vishvavidyalaya but after a short period he moved to Nalbari, Assam as a lecturer of English literature. He got retired from Swami Sahajanand Mahavidyalaya as its principal.

Career

Teaching career
From 1958 to 1986 he was in Nalbari College, Assam as a lecturer in English Department. From 1986 to 1995 he was in Swami Sahajanand Saraswati PG College, Ghazipur, UP as a Principal. He got the Moortidevi Award from Bharatiya Jnanpith and many awards from UP, WB and Assam Government.

Writing career
Kuber Nath Rai dedicated his writing entirely to the form of the essay.

His collections of essays Gandha Madan, Priya neel-kanti, Ras Aakhetak, Vishad Yog, Nishad Bansuri, Parna mukut have enormously enriched the form of essay. A scholar of Indian culture and western literature, he was proud of Indian heritage. His love for natural beauty and Indian folk literatures and preference for agricultural society over the age of machines, his romantic outlook, aesthetic sensibility, his keen eye on contemporary reality and classical style place him very high among contemporary essayists in Hindi.

Main works
 Andhkaar Mein Agnishikha, Prabhat Prakashan, .
 Priya Neelkanthi, Bharatiya Jnanpith, 1969.
 Ras Aakhetak, Bharatiya Jnanpith, 1971.
 Gandhmaadan, Bharatiya Jnanpith, 1972.
 Nishad Bansuri, 1973.
 Vishad Yoga, National Publishing Hause (Delhi), 1974.
 Parn mukut, Lok Bhāratī Prakāśana (Allāhābād), 1978.
 Mahakavi ki Tarjani, National Publiśiṅg Hāuse (Delhi), 1979
 Patr:Maniputul ke naam, Viśvavidyālaya Prakāśana (Vārāṇasī), (1980) reprint 2004.
 Manpawan ki Nauka, Prabhāt Prakāśana (Delhi), 1983.
 Kirat nadi mein Chandramadhu, Viśvavidyālaya Prakāśana (Vārāṇasi), 1983.
 Dristi Abhisaar, National Publiśhiṅg Hāuse (New Delhi), 1984
 Treta ka vrihatsaam, National Publiśhiṅg Hāuse (New Delhi), 1986.
 Kaamdhenu, Rājapal& Sons (Delhi), 1990.
 Maraal, Bharatiya Jnanpith, 1993.
 Agam ki Nav
 Vani ka kshirsagar
 Ramayana Mahateertham, Bharatiya Jnanpith (New Delhi), 2002
 Kanthamani (Kavya Sangrah), Viśvavidyālaya Prakāśana, (Vārāṇasī), 1998
 Uttarkuru, 1993.
 Cinmaya Bhārata: ārsha-cintana ke buniyādī sūtra, Hindustānī Academy, (Allahabad), 1996

Anthologies of essays
 Kuberanātha Rāya ke pratinidhi nibandha, Sāhitya Bhavana (Allahabad), 1991
 Kuber Nath Rai Sanchayan, Sahitya Academy

See also
 List of Indian writers
 Sitakant Mahapatra
 Tapan Kumar Pradhan
 Odisha Public Service Commission

References

Works on Rai
 Rajiv Ranjan, 'Bhartiyata Ki Sankalpana Aur Kuber Nath Rai' (2009) Dept. Of Lit. Mahatma Gandhi Anatrrashtriya Hindi Vishwavidyalaya, Wardha Maharashtra
Kuber Nath Rai: Parichay Aur Pahchan, Rajiv Ranjan,2014, Ashish Prakashan Kanpur, 
 DR. Ajay RAI, "Lalit Nibandh Parampara Aur Kubre Nath Rai" V.B.S Purvanchal University , Jaunpur, U.P.
 Sankar Chandak, Kuber Nath Rai Ke Nibandhan Ka Swaroop Aur Shilpa Vidhan. V.B.S Purvanchal University , Jaunpur, U.P., 2001.
 Vishwanath Prasad Tiwari, Bhartiya Sahitya ke Nirmata, Kubernath Rai, Sahitya Akademi, New Delhi (2007)
 Aman Mohindra;Kubernath Rai ke Lalit Nibandhon Ka Saanskritik Vishleshan, Punjabi University, Patiala.2003
 Suresh Maheshwari, Lalit Nibandhakar Kuberanath Ray: Vyaktitva-Krtitva Ki Lalit Alocana, Bhavana Prakasana; 1st edition (1999),

External links
 Odisha Public Service Commission https://web.archive.org/web/20090619073729/http://opsc.nic.in/ocs-main.pdf

1933 births
1996 deaths
Hindi-language writers
Indian male essayists
People from Ghazipur
Writers from Uttar Pradesh
20th-century Indian essayists
Recipients of the Moortidevi Award